Dovilė Gailevičiūtė (born 21 July 1996) is a Lithuanian footballer who plays as a midfielder and has appeared for the Lithuania women's national team.

Career
Since 2012 she played for lithuanian FC Gintra, Lithuanian champions. 

Gailevičiūtė has been capped for the Lithuania national team, appearing for the team during the 2019 FIFA Women's World Cup qualifying cycle.

In January 2022 she signed with italian Pink Bari, which played in Serie B.

References

External links
 
 
 

1996 births
Living people
Women's association football midfielders
Lithuanian women's footballers
Lithuania women's international footballers
Gintra Universitetas players